The Vietnam national under-21 football team represents Vietnam at international youth association football competitions for age under-19 and under-20. It is controlled by the Vietnam Football Federation.

International records

Nations Cup Malaysia 2016

International U-21 Thanh Niên Newspaper Cup

Players

Current squad

References

External links 
 

U-20
Asian national under-21 association football teams